Rafalus minimus is a species of jumping spider in the genus Rafalus that lives in the United Arab Emirates. The male was first described in 2010.

References

Salticidae
Spiders of Asia
Spiders described in 2010